Big Time is the sixth studio album by American singer-songwriter Angel Olsen, and her first original release since All Mirrors (2019). The album was released on June 3, 2022 by Jagjaguwar. Produced by Olsen and Jonathan Wilson, the album was preceded by the singles "All the Good Times", "Big Time" and "Through the Fires". The record was accompanied by a 28-minute visual counterpart, directed by Kimberly Stuckwisch.

Critical reception

At Metacritic, which assigns a normalised rating out of 100 to reviews from mainstream publications, the album received an average score of 88 based on 22 reviews, indicating "universal acclaim". John Amen of PopMatters praised the album, writing, "With Big Time, Olsen draws inspiration from some of popular music's most perennial templates, revamping them and, once again, reinventing herself."

Track listing

Personnel
Credits are adapted from the Big Time liner notes.

Musicians

 Angel Olsen – vocals (all tracks), guitar (1–8)
 Dan Higgins – horn arrangement (1), flute, saxophone (1, 6, 8)
 Emily Elhaj – bass (1–4, 6–9), guitar (1)
 Jake Blanton – guitar (1–4, 6, 9), bells (1), sitar (4)
 Jonathan Wilson – drums (1–4, 6–9), guitar (1, 2, 4, 6–8), Mellotron (1, 6), percussion (1–4, 6–10), zither (3); bass, double bass (5); mandolin (6), harmonium (8)
 Drew Erickson – string & horn arrangements, conductor, piano (all tracks), organ (1–4, 6, 7, 9), Wurlitzer (3), harpsichord (4, 5, 7, 8), bass (6), clavichord (7), synthesizer 
 Steve Holtman – trombone (1, 6, 8)
 Wayne Bergeron – trumpet (1, 6, 8)
 Gus Seyffert – guitar (2)
 Spencer Cullum – guitar (2, 3, 7)
 Grant Milliken – vibraphone (4, 7, 9)
 Jacob Braun – cello (5, 6, 8, 10)
 Zach Dellinger – viola (5, 6, 8–10)
 Andrew Bullbrook – violin (5, 6, 8–10)
 Wynton Grant – violin (5, 6, 8–10)

Technical
 Angel Olsen – production
 Jonathan Wilson – production, mixing
 Adam Ayan – mastering
 Grant Milliken – studio personnel
 Mirza Sherrif – studio personnel

Charts

References

External links

2022 albums
Angel Olsen albums
Jagjaguwar albums